Opposition to Haile Selassie relied largely of internal administration of his country. While Haile Selassie made attempt to modernize the country and brought to global power since Italy's occupation in 1936–41, the later administration met with negative public attitude especially among educated people in universities and peasants.
 
Several coups made to overthrow Haile Selassie government notability in 1960 and finally in the 1974 revolution. One of the most notorious events that degraded Haile Selassie reputations include overtaxing system in Gojjam since 1930, famines in Wollo and Tigray since 1958, and autocratic land seizure. 

The first student movements were held in 1965 at Addis Ababa University seeking land redistribution and abolition of feudalism in the Ethiopian Empire. Other aspect includes the Eritrean War of Independence in 1962, seeking Eritrea autonomy from the Ethiopian imperial government.

Foreign contributions
After returning to the throne following Italy's occupation of Ethiopia from 1936 to 1941, Haile Selassie externally contributed for African decolonization in the Cold War made him internationally popular. He played a significant role for placing Ethiopia into advantage strategic position in Suez Canal, supported by the United States, the Soviet bloc and non-aligned Yugoslavia against each other. In addition, Addis Ababa was chosen as the seat for the United Nations Economic Commission for Africa (UNECA) headquarters in 1958, and of the Organization of African Unity (OAU) in 1963, culminating in historical milestone in the mid-1960s.

1960s – early 1970s students upheavals

On 13 December 1960, a military coup d'état took place in Addis Ababa at Guenete Leul Palace while Haile Selassie return from state visit to Brazil, the coup was deadly coordinated in the capital city until the 1974 Revolution. This coup considered the initial point of student movements.

However, there are given factors for student movements development. For example, in 1958, the Accra Conference of Independent African States were held as the Ethiopian Imperial government anxiously managed to securing the newly independent African countries, announcing 200 scholarships to students from other parts of Africa to study in institutions of the higher learning in the country.

By 1962–63, the program has benefited 120 students from Egypt, Ghana, Kenya, Liberia, Nigeria, Rhodesia, Somalia, and Tanganyika (now Tanzania). Most countries successfully decolonized by dramatic political struggle, both internal and colonialism, and because of Ethiopian students learned this achievement of African countries, they determined to emancipated from feudal status of their country.
Ethiopian students also contributed to fall of Haile Selassie regime and precursor to 1974 revolution by organizing nationwide protests. Student movements generally began in December 1960, when students from Addis Ababa University College gathered to support the 1960 coup d'état.

The second movement was stemmed from the Ethiopian University Service (EUS) Program which was introduced in 1964. This program was mandatory for Ethiopian students to work one year in Provinces, numbered 132 in that year, increasing to 262 in 1966–67 and 590 in 1971–72, mainly served as teachers. For example, in 1966–67, 189, or 72.1% of the participants, taught in schools. These teachers, who also participated in "numerous extracurricular activities" brought to the outlying schools first-hand information of the Ethiopian Students Movement, which was virtually restricted in Addis Ababa campuses during its early existence. 

The small students sectors were inactive for few years after the 1960 coup d'état. By 1965, students from Addis Ababa University marched in the streets of the city under slogan of "Land to the Tiller". Staged in February 1965, sought parliamentary discussion about a bill that regulate tenancy, meant demanding more drastic land reform, land distribution instead.

Wollo crisis

The northern provinces of Gondar, Gojjam, Wollo and Tigray are enriched with plow-based agriculture. Between 1928 and 1930, rebellions of Wollo against Shewan domination caused by Ras Gugsa Wale, a northern Amhara lord, claiming the throne against Shewan Ras Teferi (who crowned himself Haile Selassie after defeating the revolt). The Haile Selassie government responded by suppression that led quartering soldiers with local people, coupled with the interruption of salt trade, high lootings and confiscation of cattle. Combined to locust and droughts, this resulted a famine. 

Haile Selassie ordered importation of grain from India to supply Addis Ababa without relief for north Wollo. Political measures were taken immediately such as replacing much of the administration, which formerly had grassroots, with appointees from Shewa, and joining the rebellion provinces in southern Wollo.

Woyane revolt

Following defeating the Italians in 1941, there were revolt in Tigray Province, also known as the Woyane Rebellion, the most internal threat that Haile Selassie faced. With the alliance of Oromo semi-pastoralists of Raya Azebo, disgruntled peasants, and some feudal lords, headed by famous shifta, Haile Mariam Reda, they were able controlling the whole province. The British aircraft called from Aden to suppress the rebels via bombardment.

While some aristocratic members such as Ras Seyoum Mengesha willingly administered the province in treated manner, there were reprisals against ordinary people, most notably the Raya and Azebo Oromo were subjected to wholesale land alienation, and much of their territories transferred to Wollo. As a result, the area deadly hit by famine in consequence.

Gojjam revolt
Gojjam had history of independence for centuries and detachment to Shewan rule. The Gojjam revolt was as a result of imposition of tax by the central government and confiscation of land. The taxation was not only for imposition, but feared that it would undermine traditional land tenure and the farmers independence destroyed.

There were attempts of measure in Gojjam in the 1940s and 1950s; as peasant resistance came to light, all attempted of violence failed. In early 1960s, Gojjam paid 0.1% of land, meanwhile being one of the richest and most populous provinces, By contrast to smaller provinces such as Bale, Gojjam paid less land tax. In 1951/52, there was armed resistance, including plot to assassinate Haile Selassie, but reappeared broadly in 1968 as part of systematic attempt to levy an agricultural income tax to date.

In February 1968, in response of arrival of political parties of government officials accompanied by armed police, the peasants of Mota and Bichena districts resorted to armed resistance. After months of stalemate and antigovernmental resistance, Haile Selassie sent troops to Gojjam in July and August. Several hundreds death from the incident. In 1969, Haile Selassie cancelled all tax and made no series attempt to collected the new taxes.

Famine in Wollo and Tigray

In 1974, Haile Selassie was criticized for concealing the famine existence in Wollo 1972–73.  Addis Ababa University Professor Mesfin Woldemariam documented that the 1958 and 1966 famines in Tigray and Wollo treated as official indifference, affected the peasants, and was considered one of Haile Selassie notorious reputation for these chained events.

The 1958 famine in Tigray went without government relief. In 1965/6, famines from Were Ilu province arrived to Ministry of the Interior in November 1965, one month after the situation became clear to the local police, without measure taken. It took 302 days to reach the Emperor, who then respond to the Ministry to act, a required request to Wollo authority to send list of names of people who died from famine. Small relief distribution was set up.

Eritrean federation with Ethiopia
 

After being a colony of Italy since 1882, Eritrea was placed under British military administration in 1941, in the course of East African Campaign. In 1947, Italy renounced all rights and titles and possession of locality Eritrea under a peace treaty.  The UN General Assembly held meeting about the fate of Eritrea, in which the majority of the delegates voted for the federation with Ethiopia, which Eritrea became constituent state of the federation of Ethiopia and Eritrea in 1952. This was met with discontent among the Eritrean separatist movement and eventually led to the formation of the Eritrean Liberation Front (ELF) in 1961. Hamid Idris Awate officially began armed resistance against the government of Ethiopia on 1 September 1961, resulting in the Eritrean War of Independence in 1962. In 1962, Emperor Haile Selassie unilaterally dissolved the federation and the Eritrean parliament and annexed the country.

On 14 November 1962, the Ethiopian government breached the terms of the UN Resolution 390 (A) and its own volition annexed Eritrea determining it a province.

References

Haile Selassie
Ethiopian Empire
20th century in Ethiopia